Pancana is an Austronesian language of Buton Island, off the southeast coast of Sulawesi in Indonesia. It belongs to the Muna–Buton branch of the Celebic subgroup. It is in the Munic subbranch of the Muna–Buton languages.

References

Muna–Buton languages
Languages of Sulawesi